The Clerk of the Circuit Court of Cook County is the clerk of Circuit Court of Cook County, located in Cook County, Illinois.

Office description

On January 1, 1964, the circuit courts of Cook County were unified. Before this, there were more than 200 separate courts in Cook County. In its unified form, it now had a single, popularly elected, clerk of court.

Pre-1964 officeholders
Notable pre-1964 officeholders included Norman T. Gassette and Jacob Gross.

Officeholders since 1964
The following individuals have held the office since the modern iteration of the Circuit Court of Cook County was established in 1964.

Recent election results

|-
| colspan=16 style="text-align:center;" |Clerk of the Circuit Court general elections
|-
!Year
!Winning candidate
!Party
!Vote (pct)
!Opponent
!Party
! Vote (pct)
!Opponent
!Party
! Vote (pct)
!Opponent
!Party
! Vote (pct)
|-
|1984
| | Morgan M. Finley
| | Democratic
| | 1,260,257 (61.32%)
| | Deborah L. Murphy
| | Republican
| | 794,882	(38.68%)
| 
| 
| 
| 
| 
| 
|-
|1988
| | Aurelia Pucinski
| | Democratic
| | 1,170,558 (59.38%)
| | Edward R. Vrdolyak
| | Republican
| | 800,783	(40.62%)
| 
| 
| 
| 
| 
| 
|-
|1992
| | Aurelia Pucinski
| | Democratic
| | 1,349,837 (68.39%)
| | Herbert T. Schumann, Jr.
| | Republican
| | 486,185 (24.63%)
|Text style="background:#D2B48C | Deloris "Dee" Jones
|Text style="background:#D2B48C | Harold Washington Party
|Text style="background:#D2B48C | 137,642 (6.97%)
| 
| 
| 
|-
|1996
| | Aurelia Pucinski
| | Democratic
| | 1,149,216 (70.37%)
| | Sandra M. Stavropoulos
| | Republican
| | 397,191 (24.32%)
|Text style="background:#D2B48C | Philip Morris
|Text style="background:#D2B48C | Harold Washington Party
|Text style="background:#D2B48C | 64,204 (3.03%)
| Janet Dennis
| Justice Party 
| 22,581 (1.38%)
|-
|2000
| | Dorothy A. Brown
| | Democratic
| | 1,197,773 (72.94%)
| | Nancy F. Mynard
| | Republican
| | 444,336 (27.06%)
| 
| 
| 
| 
| 
| 
|-
|2004
| | Dorothy A. Brown
| | Democratic
| | 1,365,285 (74.06%)
| | Judith A. Kleiderman
| | Republican
| | 478,222 (25.94%)
| 
| 
| 
| 
| 
| 
|-
|2008
| | Dorothy A. Brown
| | Democratic
| | 1,315,731 (68.29%)
| | Dianne S. Shapiro
| | Republican
| | 517,115 (26.84%)
| | Paloma Andrade
| | Green
| | 93,906 (4.87%)
| 
| 
| 
|-
|2012
| | Dorothy A. Brown
| | Democratic
| | 1,291,499 (70.44%)
| | Diane S. Shapiro
| | Republican
| | 541,973 (29.56%)
| 
| 
| 
| 
| 
| 
|-
|2016
| | Dorothy A. Brown
| | Democratic
| | 1,345,696 (67.22%)
| | Diane S. Shapiro
| | Republican
| | 656,232 (32.78%)
| 
| 
| 
| 
| 
| 
|-
|2020
| | Iris Y. Martinez
| | Democratic
| | 1,549,615 (73.03%)
| | Barbara Bellar
| | Republican
| | 572,169	(26.97%)
| 
| 
| 
| 
| 
|

References